Edwin W. Atwood (September 1875 – January 31, 1958) was a Michigan politician.

Political life
He was elected as the Mayor of City of Flint in 1920 for a two 1 year terms.  He was re-elected unopposed in 1921.  In 1928, Atwood was a Michigan delegate to Republican National Convention.

References

External links

Mayors of Flint, Michigan
1875 births
1958 deaths
Michigan Republicans
20th-century American politicians